We'll All Go Riding on a Rainbow is the third studio album by the Caretaker, an alias of musician Leyland Kirby. Released in 2003, it was the last of Kirby's "haunted ballroom trilogy", which spans his albums influenced by the film The Shining. It features looped melodies and vinyl crackle to create the ambience of The Shinings ballroom, with its artwork emphasizing this style. We'll All Go Riding on a Rainbow was met with positive reception from music critics, who praised its haunted ballroom ambiance. However, other critics felt that the album's length was an issue. Kirby's next album as the Caretaker, Theoretically Pure Anterograde Amnesia (2005) would abandon the haunted ballroom concept and install themes of memory loss.

Background
The Caretaker's first record, Selected Memories from the Haunted Ballroom (1999), was inspired by the haunted ballroom scene from the film The Shining. Leyland Kirby, the English musician responsible for the Caretaker's album, was involved in controversy due to his V/Vm alias. He manipulated pop songs to create several noise releases, including an extreme distortion of "The Lady in Red" by musician Chris de Burgh. Following the Caretaker's debut, A Stairway to the Stars found praise from music critics for its atmosphere. His first three albums under the Caretaker alias were later named the "haunted ballroom trilogy" due to their influence from The Shinings scene. Kirby's next release after We'll All Go Riding on a Rainbow, Theoretically Pure Anterograde Amnesia (2005) would add several layers of complexity to the pseudonym, as it directly explored memory loss.

Composition and release
We'll All Go Riding on a Rainbow explores hauntology, noise, British dance band, electronic, experimental, ambient, easy listening, and dark ambient. Its 16 tracks sample ballroom songs from the early 20th century,  Elements of the tracks include saxophone brasses, vinyl crackling, and echoing, reverberation, and pitch effects. Like in The Disintegration Loops (20022003) by composer William Basinski, the record involves themes of decay, degradation, and deterioration. The album's atmosphere is that of The Shinings haunted ballroom, with hissing sound effects overlaying orchestras. The music intends to be eerie and atmospheric, placing the listener in the 1920s. It features both negative and positive track titles, such as "Driven beyond the limits" and "Roll up the carpet and dance" respectively.

We'll All Go Riding on a Rainbow was released on 1 July 2003. When some of his audience asked Kirby if he could reissue We'll All Go Riding on a Rainbow or A Stairway to the Stars, Kirby said: "I just need to work out what and when." Most of the record's tracks feature the pattern of horns, vinyl crackle, and ambiance. They are composed of loops that slightly change as they repeat, with the instruments sustaining a long note for a brief amount of time at the end of each loop. The background noises merge, producing the Caretaker's signature sound. A track that differs from these patterns is "Contemplation", whereby its sonar-like style, akin to musician Loscil, connects various sound effects and melodies, making it stand out from the other compositions.

Artwork
The artwork depicts a dancing couple in front of a band with white suits at a floating dancefloor. The faces are solidly black, with the man featuring a moustache and the woman, a mouth. It represents reality losing shape; the band seems to invite the viewer to join them.

Critical reception

We'll All Go Riding on a Rainbow was met with positive reception from music critics, who praised its haunted ballroom ambiance. AllMusic critic John Bush stated the record could even convince listeners that "Kirby has actually spent time in a haunted ballroom". Writing for Stylus Magazine, Todd Burns criticized the 50-minute length, which made it fall "prey to the problem of most screwed music". Noting the record's difference to Kirby's V/Vm releases, Andy Slocombe of Comes with a Smile felt the album's "depth is sometimes breathtaking, and the overall effect is totally all-consuming." Slocombe added that it is "highly recommended, if you're up to it." When reviewing the Caretaker's later record Patience (After Sebald) (2012), Fact argued We'll All Go Riding on a Rainbow was when the haunted ballroom concept started leaving listeners "wondering just how much mileage could be left in such an idiosyncratic and specific aesthetic." The record's opener "I saw your face in a dream" was one of the listed tracks on a program of the BBC Radio 1.

Track listing
Adapted from Bandcamp.

References

External links
  on Bandcamp
 
 
 
 

1999 albums
The Caretaker (musician) albums